The 40th FIE Fencing World Cup began in October 2010 and concluded in August 2011 at the 2011 World Fencing Championships held in Catania, Italy.

Individual Épée

Individual Foil

Individual Sabre

Team Épée

Team Foil

Team Sabre

References 

Fencing World Cup
2010 in fencing
2011 in fencing
International fencing competitions hosted by Italy
2011 in Italian sport